Captain Planet and the Planeteers is a video game released for various platforms in the early 1990s, loosely based on the environmentalist animated series Captain Planet and the Planeteers and developed by Mindscape Inc. Three versions were developed to suit three different platform capabilities, each with markedly different gameplay. The Amiga and Atari ST versions were released in late 1991, and the ZX Spectrum, Amstrad CPC, Nintendo Entertainment System, and Sega Mega Drive versions were released in 1992.

Gameplay

NES version 
The NES version has five levels, each of which are divided into two different types of stages. The first involves controlling the international teen heroes, the Planeteers, flying their Eco-Jet to an enemy fortress, while avoiding instant death by touching any of the scenery, projectiles, or birds. The second stage involves controlling Captain Planet, fighting toward an ecovillain from the TV series.

The NES version's levels are set in the Yellowstone National Park, the Atlantic Ocean, Africa, and Antarctica.

Amiga/Atari ST version 
The Amiga/Atari version has five stages, one for each Planeteer, and a final stage controlling Captain Planet. Each Planeteer stage has at least one objective, and some have two: to clean up pollution using the Planeteer's magic ring power, or to rescue a particular type of animal using a Planeteer vehicle. Completing the objectives opens the exit gate for the level; touching environmental hazards or the unusual monsters costs a life, failing the objective by killing any of the animals will crack the Planeteer's ring depicted at the bottom of the screen (in the Amiga version), opening the level's exit gate early. The final level allows the player to control Captain Planet, who must be navigated to the end of the stage by using and swapping powers held in bubbles throughout the level. He has an ecovillan boss fight, with either Hoggish Greedly, Dr. Blight and her computer MAL, Looten Plunder and his assistant Argos Bleak, or Duke Nukem.

Reception 
The computer magazine Crash rated the game 88 out of 100. Sega Pro gave the game a mixed review, rating it 59 out of 100 and describing it as "dull and repetitive".

References 

1991 video games
Amiga games
Amstrad CPC games
Captain Planet
Nintendo Entertainment System games
Platform games
Video games based on animated television series
Video games based on Hanna-Barbera series and characters
ZX Spectrum games
Superhero video games
Video games set in Africa
Video games set in the United States
Video games set in Antarctica
Fictional works set in the Atlantic Ocean
Video games developed in Canada
Single-player video games
Environmental mass media
Mindscape games